Bernie O'Neill may refer to:
 Bernie O'Neill (politician), former member of the Pennsylvania House of Representatives
 Bernie O'Neill (bowls), Northern Irish lawn bowler
 Bernie O'Neill (Gaelic footballer) (born 1945), Irish Gaelic footballer